Alcoa Presents: One Step Beyond (also known as One Step Beyond) is an American anthology series created by Merwin Gerard. The original series was broadcast for three seasons by the American Broadcasting Company (ABC) from January 1959 to July 1961.

Overview
Created by Merwin Gerard and produced by Collier Young, One Step Beyond was hosted by John Newland, "your guide to the supernatural" (also credited as "Our guide into the world of the unknown"). Newland, who also directed every episode, presented tales that explored paranormal events and various situations that defied "logical" explanation. Unlike other anthology programs, the ABC network series episodes were presented in the form of straightforward 30-minute docudramas, all said to be based on "human record" (implying historically factual events); however, the incidents depicted were closer to popular urban legends dramatized for the screen. The program included the corporate name of sponsor Alcoa in its title for its initial run. In syndication, the program title became simply One Step Beyond.

One Step Beyond filled the time slot at 10 p.m. Tuesday vacated by the crime/police reality show Confession.

Among its varied tales, One Step Beyond dealt with premonition of death ("The Day the World Wept: The Lincoln Story") and disaster ("Tidal Wave", "Night of April 14th"); the existence of ghosts ("The Last Round", "The Death Waltz"); and wildly improbable coincidence ("Reunion"). Paula Raymond appeared in the third episode of the first season, initially broadcast on February 3, 1959, in the episode titled "Emergency Only," which also featured Jocelyn Brando as a screaming fortune teller at a party. Joan Fontaine and Warren Beatty play husband and wife in the episode "The Visitor."

Like The Twilight Zone, One Step Beyond is a hosted anthology series about other-wordly phenomena. But it actually debuted nine months before The Twilight Zone. And while The Twilight Zone was explicitly a fictional show (with both science fiction and fantasy episodes), One Step Beyond purported only to tell stories based on "human record" (documented historical events).

"The Sacred Mushroom"
A January 1961 episode, "The Sacred Mushroom," deals with the discovery of mind-altering drugs. Newland traveled to Mexico where he met with a local shaman who was an initiate in ritual use of magic mushrooms. The then-unknown mushrooms were purportedly able to increase the user's psychic powers. Newland ingested several mushrooms and allowed his reactions to be filmed for broadcast. This was the only episode of the entire series to have a relatively reality-based "documentary" tone, rather than the scripted docudramas that comprised all other episodes. Although the subject matter (the enhancement of psychic powers) accorded with the rest of the series, this episode was somewhat controversial and was omitted from the syndication; it has been seen only rarely since its original broadcast. However, according to Newland, it was the most popular episode of the series. A complete transcript of this episode is reproduced in chapter seven of The Sacred Mushrooms of Mexico by Brian Akers.

Writing staff
The show used a large number of writers. Larry Marcus was the most prolific contributor, with over 30 episodes to his credit. Marcus would later win an Emmy for his work on Route 66, and receive an Oscar nomination for his screenplay for The Stunt Man.

Other relatively frequent contributors included show creator Merwin Gerard; Don M. Mankiewicz (who would later write for Star Trek); Gabrielle Upton (who wrote for a wide range of anthology shows, including The Alfred Hitchcock Hour, and was later head writer of The Guiding Light); and Howard Rodman (later story editor of Route 66 and creator of Harry O).

Charles Beaumont wrote two episodes of One Step Beyond just before jumping over to The Twilight Zone, to which he was a major contributor. Francis Cockrell also wrote two episodes; he was a frequent writer on Alfred Hitchcock Presents and would later contribute to the second season of The Outer Limits.

Guest stars
Many famous and some not-yet-famous actors appeared in episodes of the series, including the following:

Luana Anders ("The Burning Girl")
Tod Andrews ("Brainwave")
John Beal ("The Lovers")
Warren Beatty and Joan Fontaine (together in "The Visitor")
Edward Binns ("Vanishing Point")
Whit Bissell ("Brainwave")
Robert Blake ("Gypsy")
Charles Bronson ("The Last Round")
Walter Burke ("The Front Runner")
Veronica Cartwright ("The Haunting")
Don Dubbins ("The Navigator") 1st Mate
Louise Fletcher ("The Open Window")
Byron Foulger ("Hong Kong Passage")
Arthur Franz ("The Call from Tomorrow")
Skip Homeier ("The Bride Possessed")
Ronald Howard ("The Haunting")
Werner Klemperer ("The Haunted U-Boat")
Robert Lansing ("The Voice")
Cloris Leachman and Marcel Dalio (together in "The Dark Room")
Christopher Lee ("The Sorcerer")
Robert Loggia ("The Hand")
Jack Lord ("Father Image") 
Patrick Macnee ("The Night of April 14th")
John Marley ("The Night of the Kill")
Ross Martin ("Echo")
Patty McCormack ("Make Me Not a Witch")
Ann McCrea ("Night of the Kill")
Yvette Mimieux ("The Clown")
Elizabeth Montgomery ("The Death Waltz")
André Morell ("The Avengers")
Patrick O'Neal ("The Return of Mitchell Campion")
Maria Palmer ("The Secret")
Edward Platt ("The Burning Girl")
Donald Pleasence ("The Confession")
Suzanne Pleshette ("Delusion")
Paula Raymond ("Emergency Only")
Pernell Roberts ("The Vision")
Albert Salmi ("The Peter Hurkos Story") Part I & Part II
William Schallert ("Tidal Wave" and "Epilogue")
William Shatner ("The Promise")
Olan Soule ("The Navigator") Stowaway/Deadman
Torin Thatcher ("Doomsday")
Harry Townes ("The Bride Possessed")
Yvette Vickers and Mike Connors (together in "The Aerialist")
Robert Webber ("The Captain and His Guests")
Peter Wyngarde ("Nightmare...")

Production
The last 13 episodes of the third season were filmed at MGM Studios, Borehamwood, England, due to a suggestion by Newland. According to Newland, "I thought it would give a little boost to the show because Great Britain offered good actors, good situations, and good settings. We sought permission from Alcoa, and they okayed it."

Music
Harry Lubin composed the music for the series with a soundtrack album, Music from 'One Step Beyond''' released by Decca Records (DL 8970) in 1960. The most well-known tracks of the series were entitled: "Weird" (originally composed by Lubin for the score of an April 1955 Loretta Young Show episode, "Feeling No Pain"), usually played when the supernatural aspect of the episode was being discussed, and "Fear" that became the musical theme of the series.

The Ventures included a cover version of the show's main theme music "Fear" in their highly acclaimed 1964 Dolton Records album The Ventures in Space. The second season of The Outer Limits used a variation of "Fear" for the end titles.
A heavy metal cover of the title song was recorded by the band Fantômas on their album The Director's Cut in 2001.

Episodes
Season 1 (1959)

Season 2 (1959–60)

Season 3 (1960–61)

Syndication
After its cancellation during 1961, the series continued to be shown throughout the United States in off-network syndication until the early 1980s.

For its re-release to television for the Sci-Fi Channel during the 1990s, the initial and end titles were given new theme music and graphics designed for the time, as if the show had continued into the 1990s. These episodes were also edited for time from 25 minutes to 22 minutes.

Despite the public domain status for most episodes, the series' remaining copyrights belongs to its distributor CBS Television Distribution. CTD is the successor to the series' previous distributors, which include ABC Films successor Worldvision Enterprises and CTD's predecessor Paramount Domestic Television.

Episodes are currently broadcast by the Retro Television Network available as a digital subchannel in some US markets. Full episodes are also available for digital streaming on Amazon Prime (charge per episode as of 2021), FMC Movie Classics (free), Tubi (free), and Amazing Classics (free).

In May 2021 the UK nostalgia channel Talking Pictures TV began to broadcast the series, with the first episode airing on 11 May.

Home media
During 2007, Mill Creek Entertainment released a 4-disc Region 1 DVD set entitled The Very Best of One Step Beyond. The set contains 50 episodes. The quality varied drastically from episode to episode.

On September 15, 2009, CBS Home Entertainment (distributed by Paramount) released One Step Beyond - The Official 1st Season on Region 1 DVD.One Step Beyond is the first pre-1973 in-house production of ABC to get a DVD release from CBS/Paramount. Other shows once distributed by ABC Films (which became Worldvision Enterprises) were either released by CBS/Paramount because the company owns the libraries of the actual producers of the shows (such as The Fugitive or The Mod Squad), or were released by different companies because ancillary rights are owned by other entities (such as George of the Jungle).

The Film Chest Media Group released the series in a six-disc Collector's Box on April 7, 2015. The box features only 70 episodes of the series, however (mostly episodes from the first two seasons). Very few of the third-season episodes are on this set.

Delta Entertainment Corporation in 2005 released a collection of 33 (presumably public domain) episodes on eight region-free DVDs.

The Next Step Beyond
During 1978, the series was revived partly by Gerard and Young, with John Newland hosting and directing most of the episodes; the new series was named The Next Step Beyond. The series was broadcast for one year with 25 episodes, 14 of which were remakes of One Step Beyond episodes.

See also

 Beyond Belief: Fact or Fiction The Outer Limits The Twilight Zone Night Gallery Science Fiction Theater Twin Peaks The X-Files The Hunger Masters of Horror Masters of Science Fiction Suspense Alfred Hitchcock Presents Hammer House of Horror Science fiction on television

 References 

 Bibliography 
 

Further reading
 Remington, Fred (February 15, 1959). "One Step Beyond". The Pittsburgh Press. p. TV6
 Gerard, Mervin (July 1988). The Big Trouble". WGA West Newsletter''. pp. 27–28

External links
 
 One Step Beyond Intro on YouTube; accessed October 31, 2014.
 John Newland interview; accessed October 31, 2014.

1959 American television series debuts
1961 American television series endings
1950s American anthology television series
1960s American anthology television series
American Broadcasting Company original programming
Black-and-white American television shows
Paranormal television
English-language television shows
Television shows shot at MGM-British Studios